Clouds Rest is a mountain in Yosemite National Park east northeast of Yosemite Village, California.  Although there are many peaks in the park having far greater elevation, the proximity of Clouds Rest to the valley gives it a very high degree of visual prominence.

Geography
The summit can be reached by a  trail hike from Tioga Pass Road or a  trail hike from Happy Isles by way of Little Yosemite Valley. There are also several technical routes available.

Clouds Rest is an arête, a thin, almost knife-like, ridge of rock formed when glaciers eroded away solid rock to form Tenaya Canyon and Little Yosemite Valley.

History
Lafayette H. Bunnell, a medical doctor with the Mariposa Battalion, notes that his party named the summit Clouds Rest because they returned to camp to avoid a snow storm after seeing "the clouds rapidly settling down to rest upon that mountain."

Recreation

There are three main ways to access the summit of Clouds Rest; via the Sunrise Lakes Trailhead off of CA-120 (commonly known as the Northeast Ridge Route); via the Happy Isles Trailhead in Yosemite Valley (commonly known as the South Slope); or via the Northwest Face of the mountain. 
The summit has wide-ranging 360-degree panoramic views.

References

External links

 

Mountains of Yosemite National Park
Mountains of Mariposa County, California
Articles containing video clips
Mountains of Northern California